The North American Open 2012 is the men's edition of the 2012 North American Open, which is a PSA World Series event Gold (Prize money: $115,000). The event took place at the Westwood Club in Richmond, Virginia in the United States from 20 to 25 February. James Willstrop won his second North American Open trophy, beating Ramy Ashour in the final.

Prize money and ranking points
For 2012, the prize purse was $115,000. The prize money and points breakdown is as follows:

Seeds

Draw and results

See also
North American Open
2012 Men's British Open

References

External links
PSA North American Open 2012 website
North American Open 2012 official website

North American Open
Men's North American Open
Men's North American Open
2012 in sports in Virginia